is a railway station in the city of Ōshū, Iwate, Japan, operated by the East Japan Railway Company (JR East).

Lines
It is 470.1 kilometers from the starting point of the Tohoku Shinkansen at Tokyo Station.

Station layout
The station has two elevated opposed side platforms with chest-high platform edge doors. The station has a Midori no Madoguchi staffed ticket office.

Platforms

History
Mizusawa-Esashi Station opened on March 14, 1985, three years after the opening of the Tōhoku Shinkansen.

Passenger statistics
In fiscal 2018, the station was used by an average of 1,003 passengers daily (boarding passengers only).

Surrounding area
Kitakami River
 
 
Mizusawa Racecourse

See also
 List of railway stations in Japan

References

External links

  

Railway stations in Iwate Prefecture
Tōhoku Shinkansen
Railway stations in Japan opened in 1985
Ōshū, Iwate